The United States has several coins and banknotes which were proposed at one time but never adopted.

Banknotes 
A three dollar bill was proposed two times during the 1860s. A design was engraved for a potential $3 United States Note, and a 1865 law called for a $3 National Bank Note, but neither proposal came to fruition.

Coinage 
There have been several United States coins which were proposed but never adopted. Most of the coins listed below, although never adopted, were produced in limited numbers as patterns.

Notes
 Pattern coins for the ring cent were struck in various metals, including copper, aluminum, and nickel, as well as billon.
 1853 ring cents are restrikes dated 1850, although they can be distinguished from the original 1850 cents in that they use a different reverse design.
 Although circulation strikes of the Half Union were to be 90% gold 10% copper, only two of the twenty known pattern coins were struck with this composition. The other 18 were struck in 100% copper, although some were later plated with gold by the mint.

References